Senator Solomon may refer to:

Malama Solomon (born 1951), Hawaii State Senate
Martin M. Solomon (born 1950), New York State Senate
Ruth Solomon (born 1941), Arizona State Senate